Jesse R. Walters, Jr. (born December 26, 1938) is a former justice of the Idaho Supreme Court, a member from 1997 to 2003.

Born in Rexburg, Idaho, Walters graduated from Idaho Falls High School in 1957, then attended Ricks College in Rexburg for a year. He transferred to the University of Idaho in Moscow, where received his bachelor's degree and a J.D. from its College of Law in 1963. He passed the bar in Idaho that year and clerked at the Idaho Supreme Court for a year, then entered private practice.

In 1977, Walters was appointed a state judge in the fourth district (Boise) by Governor John Evans and was the first chief judge of the Idaho Court of Appeals, which began in 1982.

Fifteen years later, he was appointed by Governor Phil Batt in 1997 to fill the vacancy of the retiring Charles McDevitt on the state supreme court. Walters was unopposed in 1998 and retired in 2003, succeeded by Roger Burdick.

References

Justices of the Idaho Supreme Court
University of Idaho alumni
People from Rexburg, Idaho
People from Idaho Falls, Idaho
Living people
1938 births
University of Idaho College of Law alumni